Zieluń  is a village in the administrative district of Gmina Lubowidz, within Żuromin County, Masovian Voivodeship, in east-central Poland.

The village has an approximate population of 800.

External links
 Jewish Community in Zieluń on Virtual Shtetl

References

Villages in Żuromin County